The Stormers (known for sponsorship reasons as the DHL Stormers) is a South African professional rugby union team based in Cape Town in the Western Cape that competes in the United Rugby Championship, a trans-hemispheric competition that also involves sides from Ireland, Italy, Scotland and Wales. They competed in the Super Rugby competition until 2020.

They are centred on the Western Province Currie Cup side, but also draw players from the Boland Cavaliers (covering the Cape Winelands and West Coast districts, with home matches in Wellington). Through 2005, they also drew players from the SWD Eagles (George), which meant that they drew players from all three unions in the Western Cape Province. However, the general realignment of franchise areas resulting from the expansion of the competition resulted in the Eagles being moved to the area of the Southern Spears (later succeeded by the Southern Kings).

Prior to 1998, South Africa did not use a franchise system for the Super 12, instead sending the top four unions from its domestic competition, the Currie Cup, into the Super 12. In 1996, the Stormers qualified and competed in the Super 12 as Western Province. In 1997, they did not qualify, the 4th South African team being the Orange Free State (now the Free State Cheetahs at Currie Cup level; the region would later be represented in Super 12 by the Cats (now known as the Lions) and in Super 14 by the Cheetahs).

The Stormers played their first ever final, against the Bulls in front of 36,000 fans in Johannesburg, in 2010 after beating the Waratahs in the semi-final stage but ultimately lost to the Bulls. In the two previous years in which they reached the semi-finals, 1999 and 2004, they were eliminated by the Highlanders and Crusaders.

They made consecutive home semifinals in 2011 and 2012, but lost both at Newlands to the Crusaders and the Sharks respectively. In 2015 they won the South African conference for a third time, before losing their home quarterfinal against the Brumbies.

In 2021-22, the Stormers, with their other South African Super Rugby colleagues the Bulls, the Sharks and the Lions, left Super Rugby to join the newly renamed United Rugby Championship with teams from Ireland, Scotland, Italy and Wales. Their first season in the URC was a success, winning the South African shield as the top team in their national conference, followed by the overall URC title with a win against the Bulls in the 2022 final. On June 2, 2022 it was confirmed that the four South African URC franchises, and the former Pro 14 franchise, the Cheetahs would be entering the European Professional Club Rugby competitions for the first time in 2022-23, with the Stormers in the first tier European Rugby Champions Cup.

History
With the launch of the Super 12 in 1996, both Australia and New Zealand adopted franchise-based models for their provincial teams that were to compete in the new competition. However, the South Africa teams were to be determined by the results of the previous season's Currie Cup, with the top four sides gaining entry in the Super 12. Newlands did see Super 12 competition during the era when this model of competition was used, with the Western Province gaining promotion for the inaugural season of 1996. However, the team did not perform that well, winning only three matches from 11 fixtures, and finishing second last on the table, though Transvaal and the Wellington Hurricanes both won the same number of games as the Western Province, they finished higher, due to a superior for and against.

The next season, South Africa adopted a similar system to that of New Zealand's and Australia's, creating four new provincial sides, and abolishing qualification through the Currie Cup. One of the sides created was the Stormers, or the Western Stormers. The Stormers' first season was fairly similar to that of the Western Province's in 1996, winning just the three games out of 11 fixtures, though they finished in ninth place overall on the table.

The 1999 Super 12 season was far more successful for the Stormers, as they lost only three matches during the regular season; against the ACT Brumbies, the Otago Highlanders and fellow South African team, the Cats, though the Stormers ended up finishing higher on the table than all of those sides, finishing in second place overall, behind the Queensland Reds. The Stormers thus qualified for the semi-finals for the first time and, due to their log position, hosted their semi-final in Cape Town. However, they were defeated by the Otago Highlanders, 33 points to 18.

In 2000, the Stormers fell just short of making the finals again, as they finished in fifth position, with a total of 31 points, just one point behind the Cats and Highlanders who both made it to the semi-finals, on 32 points. The following season - 2001 - saw the Stormers move further away from a place in the finals, as they won only five of their 11 fixtures and finished in seventh place on the log. The following season was not any better for the Stormers, despite starting the season with an optimistic 40 to 18 win over the Sharks, the Stormers ended up finishing in ninth place on the log.

The 2004 season saw the Stormers return to the success of 1999, as they qualified for the play-offs again. The team finished in third place overall, with seven wins, and on 34 points, one point more than the fourth placed Chiefs. The Stormers travelled to Jade Stadium in Christchurch, where they met the Crusaders in the semi-final. The home team won, defeating the Stormers 27 points to 16. The following season the Stormers fell to ninth place on the table come the end of the regular season, far from finals contention.

For the 2006 season, the Super 12 became the Super 14, with the addition of two new teams; one from Australia, the Western Force, and one from South Africa, the Cheetahs. The Stormers won four of the now 13 regular rounds, finishing in 11th place in the final standings.

The year 2008 was one of revival for the Stormers after Kobus van der Merwe was fired and ex-Cheetahs coach, Rassie Erasmus, was brought in as head coach and WP Director of Rugby. Rassie Erasmus was hoping for a top half of the table finish, however the Stormers exceeded expectations and after losing their first 3 games of the season fought back to finish tied for 4th place on the log, missing out on an away semi final due to an inferior points difference to the Hurricanes.

After a poor 2009, Allister Coetzee was appointed the coach and the Stormers reshuffled their squad, bringing in many new faces including Springbok stars Jacque Fourie and Bryan Habana, while losing a host of players such as Springbok centre Jean de Villiers (Munster), fullback Percy Montgomery (Retired) and controversial flank Luke Watson (Bath). The Stormers enjoyed a successful start to their 2010 campaign, winning 5 of their first 6 games. They then started their four match tour of the Antipodes and while they disappointingly lost to the then last-placed Western Force and a resurgent Queensland Reds, they defeated the Blues and Chiefs to be firmly in semi-final contention at the end of the tour. They returned home to South Africa and after cruising past the Crusaders, they lost to the Sharks. This meant that they had to win their last game against the Bulls to claim a home semi-final. The Bulls, already qualified in first position, fielded a weakened line-up and the Stormers duly beat them 38–10 for their first home semi-final since 1999. In the semi-final against the Waratahs a win was never in doubt as they beat the men from Sydney 25–6, the game's only try being a spectacular individual effort by Juan de Jongh. With the Bulls winning the other semi against the Crusaders, an all South African final was ensured.

After a great semifinal performance, the Stormers went down badly in the final 25–17 to the Bulls at the historic Orlando Stadium in a game that the Stormers never looked like winning.

In 2012, the Stormers topped the log for the first time, after being undefeated at home and winning almost all their South African conference games, the Stormers headed to the Semi Finals with a guaranteed home final if they won, however the Sharks managed to knock out the Cape side and left them wondering for a second straight year, this was to be revenged in October when Province gave the Sharks payback by winning the Currie Cup against them.

In 2013 the Stormers had a tough start to the season, and despite winning their last six matches it was not enough to secure a play-off spot as they ended the season in seventh place, the following year the Cape side ended in 11th place after winning nine and losing nine games, however in 2015 they managed to qualify for the play-off once more after winning the South African conference before going down to the Brumbies in a home play-off match at Newlands.

With the departure of Allister Coetzee at the end of the 2015 season, the Stormers appointed former Springbok centre Robbie Fleck as the new head coach in 2016.

With 2020 being the last season at Newlands rugby stadium, a new head coach in John Dobson and a forward pack loaded with world cup winning Springboks, the class of 2020 will fancy their chances of bringing back some long awaited silverware as a farewell gift to the old faithful.

Strip
The very first (Western) Stormers jersey and logo in 1998 combined the colours of the three Unions who made up the regional franchise – WP, SWD and Boland. There were a myriad of colours in the jersey – blue, white, red, green, gold – and a triangular logo with a wave affect inside. Some liked the look, most did not. One newspaper scribe wrote: "It looks like scrambled eggs with a box of Smarties thrown in!"

In 1999 came a dramatic change from the "loud" look to a simple black jumper and shorts, with black and white "Barbarian" socks, bold numbering and the now familiar lightning bolt logo on the breast. The move to black was done with the express purpose of appealing to a much wider audience. Black became one of the core attributes of the Stormers brand.

2007, however, saw a move away from black to navy blue as the Stormers and WP brands converged.

In 2011, white bars across the front of the navy blue jersey was introduced in order to bring it further in line with the WP brand

In 2013 the colour was changed from blue to royal blue, the original colour of WP Rugby. When held to low light however, the jerseys show two different shades of blue.

From their inception until 2017, the Stormers' uniforms were made by international sportswear giants Adidas, who had likewise supplied Western Province's playing strip since 1983. However, from 2018 onwards WPRFU officials announced that both the Stormers and Province would wear unbranded jerseys manufactured by local firm Genuine Connection, who had previously been contracted by Adidas to produce their team-issue playing kits since the year 2000.

Honours

Super 12/14 (1996–2010)
 Runners-up (1): 2010
 Play-off appearances (3): 1999, 2004, 2010

Super Rugby (2011–2021)
 Semi-finalists (2): 2011 and 2012
 Qualifiers (1): 2015
 South African Conference Champions (5): 2011, 2012, 2015, 2016, 2017

Super Rugby Unlocked
 Runners-up (1): 2021

URC (2021–present)
 URC Championship: Winners 2021-2022
 South African Shield Champions (1): 2021-2022

Minor Honours
Toyota Challenge 2021
 Toyota Challenge: winners 2021

Stadium

The first official matches played at Newlands were in 1890. The ground has been continually developed over the past century, entirely by the efforts of the Western Province Rugby Football Union and its administrators. The stadium has taken on various names over the years due to sponsorship of the Western Province side, but is today simply named Newlands, a decision made by former Stormers sponsors Investec. Vodacom has since taken over sponsorship of the team and stadium, but chose not to rename the stadium. Newlands has usually drawn the largest average crowds of any stadium in Super Rugby competition. In 2002 the Stormers welcomed their millionth spectator through the gates. The ground was bought in 1888, and currently has a capacity of 50,900.

There was speculation of a possible move from Newlands to the Cape Town Stadium, which was built for the 2010 FIFA World Cup. However, the Stormers have since continued playing at Newlands. They have one of the largest crowd attendances in Super Rugby, often attracting crowds in excess of 45,000 at home Super Rugby games.

From 2021 onwards, after 131 years at Newlands and rumours of them moving stadium, the Western Province Rugby Football Union decided to change the home ground of the Stormers to the DHL Stadium.

Current squad

The Stormers squad for the 2022–23 United Rugby Championship is.

Season standings
{| class="wikitable"
|-border=1 cellpadding=5 cellspacing=0
! width="20"| Season
! width="20"|Pos
! width="20"|Pld
! width="20"|W
! width="20"|D
! width="20"|L
! width="30"|PF
! width="30"|PA
! width="30"|+/–
! width="20"|BP
! width="25"|Pts
! width="190"|Notes
|- align=center
|align=left|1996
|align=left|11th
|11||3||1||7||251||353||−102||1||15||As Western Province
|- align=center
|align=left|1998
|align=left|9th
|11||3||0||8||248||364||−116||6||18||
|- align=center
|align=left|1999
|align=left|2nd
|11||8||0||3||290||244||+46||4||36||Lost semi-final to Highlanders
|- align=center
|align=left|2000
|align=left|5th
|11||6||1||4||298||276||+22||5||31||
|- align=center
|align=left|2001
|align=left|7th
|11||5||0||6||278||285||−7||6||26||
|- align=center
|align=left|2002
|align=left|7th
|11||5||0||6||310||314||−4||7||27||
|- align=center
|align=left|2003
|align=left|9th
|11||5||0||6||255||354||−99||3||23||
|- align=center
|align=left|2004
|align=left|3rd
|11||7||0||4||286||260||+26||5||33||Lost semi-final to Crusaders
|- align=center
|align=left|2005
|align=left|9th
|11||3||1||7||215||320||−105||4||18||
|- align=center
|align=left|2006
|align=left|11th
|13||4||1||8||263||334||−71||5||23||
|- align=center
|align=left|2007
|align=left|10th
|13||6||0||7||249||326||−77||3||27||
|- align=center
|align=left|2008
|align=left|5th
|13||8||1||4||269||211||+58||7||41||
|- align=center
|align=left|2009
|align=left|10th
|13||5||0||8||235||249||−14||7||27||
|- align=center
|align=left|2010
|align=left|2nd
|13||9||0||4||365||171||+194||8||44||Lost final to Bulls
|- align=center
|align=left|2011
|align=left|2nd
|16||12||0||4||400||257||+143||7||63||Lost semi-final to Crusaders
|- align=center
|align=left|2012
|align=left|1st
|16||14||0||2||350||254||+96||2||66||Lost semi-final to Sharks
|- align=center
|align=left|2013
|align=left|7th
|16||9||0||7||346||292||+54||6||50||
|- align=center
|align=left|2014
|align=left|11th
|16||7||0||9||290||326||−36||4||32||
|- align=center
|align=left|2015
|align=left|3rd
|16||10||1||5||373||323||+50||3||45||Lost qualifier to Brumbies
|- align=center
|align=left|2016
|align=left|3rd
|15||10||1||4||440||274||+166||9||51||Lost quarter-final to Chiefs

|}

References

External links

 

 
Super Rugby teams
South African rugby union teams
Sport in Cape Town
United Rugby Championship teams
1997 establishments in South Africa
Rugby clubs established in 1997